Thomson and Thompson are fictional characters in The Adventures of Tintin, the comics series by Belgian cartoonist Hergé. They are two incompetent detectives who provide much of the comic relief throughout the series. Although they look like identical twins whose only discernible difference is the shape of their moustaches, they are in fact just doubles not brothers, just as the different spellings of their surnames suggests. They are afflicted with chronic spoonerisms, are extremely clumsy, thoroughly clueless, frequently arresting the wrong person (usually someone important). In spite of this, they somehow are entrusted with delicate missions.

The detective with the flat, drooping walrus moustache is Thompson and introduces himself as "Thompson, with a 'P', as in psychology" (or "Philadelphia", or any such word in which the "P" is silent), while the detective with the flared, pointed moustache is Thomson, who often introduces himself as "Thomson, without a 'P', as in Venezuela."

Often, when one says something, the other adds "To be precise", but then repeats what the first said, only twisted around.

Thomson and Thompson usually wear bowler hats and carry walking sticks, except when abroad: during these missions they insist on wearing the stereotypical costume of the country they are visiting, hoping to blend into the local population, but instead manage to dress in folkloric attire that actually makes them stand out.

The detectives were in part based on Hergé's father and uncle, identical twins who wore matching bowler hats while carrying matching walking sticks.

Character history
In Tintin in America there are characters similar to Thomson and Thompson: two policemen who collide with each other, and an incompetent detective called Mike MacAdam.

In Tintin in the Congo, Thomson and Thompson make only a brief one-panel appearance (although they did not appear in the original version). Their first contribution to the plot of a story comes in Cigars of the Pharaoh (originally published in 1934), where they first appear when they come into conflict with Tintin on board a ship where he and Snowy are enjoying a holiday cruise. When this adventure was first published they were referred to as X33 and X33A (X33 et X33 bis in French). Here they show an unusually high level of cunning and efficiency, going to great lengths to rescue Tintin from the firing squad (in disguises that fool even Tintin) and saving Snowy from sacrifice. In this and two other early stories — The Blue Lotus and The Black Island — they spend most of their time, forced to follow official orders and faked evidence, in pursuit of Tintin himself for crimes he has not committed, the two noting in Blue Lotus that they never believed in Tintin's guilt even though they had to obey their orders. Except for their codenames, they remained nameless in the early adventures. It was not until King Ottokar's Sceptre, published in 1938, that Tintin mentions their definitive names when introducing them to Professor Alembick at the airport.

In his 1941 play Tintin in India: The Mystery of the Blue Diamond co-written with Jacques Van Melkebeke, Hergé named them as "Durant and Durand", although he later renamed them as "Dupont and Dupond". When King Ottokar's Sceptre was serialised in Eagle for British readers in 1951, the characters were referred to as "Thomson and Thompson"; these names were later adopted by translators Leslie Lonsdale-Cooper and Michael Turner in their translation of the series into English for Methuen Publishing.

While the original version of Cigars of the Pharaoh was published in 1932, the rewritten and redrawn version was issued in 1955, and was not published in English until 1971. This resulted in some chronological confusion for English-speaking readers of the Tintin series, which is why the text hints that Tintin already knows the pair, and is surprised at their unfriendly behaviour; however, in the original chronological sequence, this is indeed the first time they ever meet. In addition, Hergé retroactively added them to the 1946 colour version of the second Tintin story, Tintin in the Congo, in the background as Tintin embarks for what is now the Democratic Republic of the Congo.

Thomson and Thompson were originally only side characters but later became more important. In the re-drawings of the earlier books, especially The Black Island, the detectives gained their now-traditional mannerisms.

In Land of Black Gold, the detectives mistakenly swallow some mysterious pills used to adulterate fuel, that causes them to sprout immensely long beards and hair that change colour constantly and grow at a break-neck pace. The condition wears off by the end of this adventure, but it relapses in Explorers on the Moon, causing problems when Captain Haddock must continuously cut their hair, repeatedly switching back to re-cut floor length hair (and mustaches and beards) which all grow back in seconds. Frustrated at this, the captain exclaims "After all this, when they ask me what did I do on the rocket, I'll reply 'Me, you say? I was the barber!'"

In the 19 books following Cigars of the Pharaoh, Thomson and Thompson appear in 17 of them, not appearing in Tintin in Tibet or Flight 714 to Sydney. In some of these books their role is minor – the duo's appearance in The Shooting Star is confined to two panels; they appear briefly only at the beginning of The Broken Ear (before being tricked into closing the case in the belief that the stolen object has been returned when it was actually replaced by a fake); and are imprisoned and face execution on false charges in Tintin and the Picaros. During their other appearances, they serve as the official investigators into whatever crimes Tintin is currently investigating. Their final appearance was in Tintin and Alph-Art.

Inspiration and cultural impact

The detectives were in part based on Hergé's father Alexis and uncle Léon, identical twins who often took walks together wearing matching bowler hats while carrying matching walking sticks. Another inspiration was a picture of two mustachioed, bowler-hatted, formally dressed detectives who were featured on the cover of the Le Miroir edition of 2 March 1919. They were shown escorting Emile Cottin, who had attacked Georges Clemenceau—one detective was handcuffed to the man while the other was holding both umbrellas.

They also make a brief cameo appearance in the Asterix book Asterix in Belgium.

They make an appearance in L'ombra che sfidò Sherlock Holmes, an Italian comic spin-off of Martin Mystère, edited by Sergio Bonelli Editore.

The name of the pop group the Thompson Twins was based on Thomson and Thompson.

The detectives are regular characters in the 1991–1992 television series The Adventures of Tintin, as well as the 2011 motion-capture film adaptation The Adventures of Tintin: The Secret of the Unicorn. In the film, Simon Pegg and Nick Frost portray Thomson and Thompson.

Names in other languages
Translators of the series in some languages have tried to find names for the pair that are common, and similar or identical in pronunciation. They thus become:
 Pichot and Pitxot in Cadaquesenc (Catalan dialect in Cadaques)
 Thomson and Thompson in English
 Schulz and Schulze in German (only in the 1990s TV Series)
 Johns and Jones or Parry-Williams and Williams-Parry in Welsh ( and Dalen editions, respectively)

In some languages, the French forms are more directly adapted, using local orthographic ambiguities:
 In Chinese

The original Dupond and Dupont are kept in Swedish, Danish, Norwegian, Hungarian, Turkish, Finnish, Indonesian, Italian, Basque, Catalan, the Casterman edition in Spanish, and the newer Portuguese editions.

See also
 List of The Adventures of Tintin characters

References

Bibliography
 
 

Animated duos
Comics characters introduced in 1934
Comic strip duos
Fictional astronauts
Fictional detectives
Twin characters in comics
Male characters in comics
Tintin characters

de:Tim und Struppi#Schulze und Schultze